Sherry Lynn is an American voice actress who has played roles in anime, animated television series and video games. She portrayed Sasami Jurai in the Tenchi Muyo! franchise.

In January 2010, in terms of total film gross, she was the Highest Grossing Female in the Movies and 23rd overall, with a total movie gross of over $2.5 billion US for her work in only 26 movies. She is also one of the co-founders and co-artistic directors of the Children's Theatre Group of Southern California.

Notable voice roles

Dubbing in Anime
 .hack//Liminality - Yuki Aihara
 Adventures of Mini-Goddess - Skuld
 Ah! My Goddess The Movie - Skuld
 Ai Tenchi Muyo! - Sasami
 Ai Yori Aoshi - Maho
 Apocalypse Zero - Yukiko Horie
 Bio Hunter - Sayaka
 Blood Lad - Liz
 Black Jack - Pinoko (OVA 8–10, uncredited)
 Cardcaptor Sakura Movie 2: The Sealed Card - Naoko Yanagisawa
 The Dog of Flanders - Eilina
 Dual! Parallel Trouble Adventure - D
 Fate/stay night - Sakura Matou
 Final Fantasy: Legend of the Crystals - Linaly
 Fushigi Yûgi Eikoden - Young Mayo (Ep. 4)
 Gad Guard - Satsuki Sanada, Young Hajiki
 Gatekeepers - Saemi Ukiya
 Ghost in the Shell: Stand Alone Complex - Tachikoma, Moe (MISSING HEARTS)
 Ghost in the Shell: Stand Alone Complex Solid State Society - Tachikoma, Togusa's Daughter
 Kiki's Delivery Service - Madame's Granddaughter (Birthday Girl)
 The Legend of Black Heaven - Eriko
 Mobile Suit Gundam - The Movie Trilogy - Letz, Zena Zabi
 Ninja Scroll: The Series - Yayoi
 Please Twins! - Akina Sagawa
 Princess Mononoke - Woman in Iron Town, Emishi Village Girl
 Psycho Diver: Soul Siren - Yuki Kano 
 Rozen Maiden - Hinaichigo
 Samurai Girl Real Bout High School - Misao Aoki
 Serial Experiments Lain - Girl (Ep. 4)
 Street Fighter Alpha: The Animation - Kei Chitose
 Tenchi Muyo! - Sasami Masaki Jurai, Tsunami, Kiyone Makibi (1st voice), Jijyo
 The Big O - Tami (Ep. 16)
 Trigun - Moore
 Ultra Maniac - Rio
 Wolf's Rain - Cheza

Animation
 A Bug's Life - Additional Voices
 Adventures from the Book of Virtues - Marygold
 Aladdin - Additional Voices
 An American Tail: Fievel Goes West - Additional Voices
 Beauty and the Beast - Additional Voices
 Bonkers - Marilyn Piquel, Katya
 Brother Bear - Additional Voices
 Cars - Additional Voices - Coriander Widetrack
 Cinderella II: Dreams Come True - Additional Voices
 Cloudy with a Chance of Meatballs - Additional Voices
 Darkwing Duck - Radiowave
 Despicable Me 2 - Additional Voices (uncredited)
 Dr. Seuss' The Lorax - Additional Voices
 DuckTales the Movie: Treasure of the Lost Lamp - Additional Voices
 The Dukes - Additional Voices
 The Emperor's New Groove - Additional Voices
 Finding Nemo - Additional Voices
 The Get Along Gang - Portia Porcupine
 Happily N'Ever After - Additional Voices
 Hercules - Additional Voices
 Horton Hears a Who! - Additional Voices
 The Hunchback of Notre Dame - Additional Voices
 Ice Age: The Meltdown - Additional Voices
 Inside Out - Mother's Joy
 The Iron Giant - Maine Woman #2
 The Little Mermaid - Adella (Ariel's sister)
 Little Nemo: Adventures in Slumberland – Bon Bon
 Minions – Additional Voices
 Monsters, Inc. – Additional Voices
 Monsters University – Additional Voices
 My Little Pony - Galaxy, Cherries Jubilee, Gingerbread, Baby Sundance, Water Lily, Princess Royal Blue, Baby Half-Note
 Osmosis Jones – Additional Voices
 Partysaurus Rex – Cuddles the Alligator
 Pink Panther and Sons – Chatta
 ProStars – Additional Voices
 Quack Pack – Alexandra Mergancer
 Quest for Camelot – Additional Voices
 Riley's First Date? – Mom's Disguist, Mom's Joy, 
 Rugrats – Sandbox Kid
 Spirited Away – Additional Voices
 Surf's Up – Additional Voices
 Tarzan – Additional Voices
 Toy Story - Additional Voices
 Toy Story 2 - Additional Voices
 Toy Story 3 - Additional Voices (uncredited)
 Up - Additional Voices
 WALL-E - Additional Voices

Merchandise
 Care Bears - Laugh-a-Lot Bear (as a stuffed toy)

Television series
 McGurk: A Dog's Life - Camille
 Between the Lions - The Punctuator (from "Little Wendy Tales")
 Who's the Boss? - Photographer

Video games
 102 Dalmatians: Puppies to the Rescue - Crystal the Snow Bunny Rabbit
 Baten Kaitos Origins - Tik & Quis
 Drakengard/Drakengard 2 - young Manah
 Final Fantasy X and X-2 - Shelinda
 Final Fantasy XIII - Additional Voices
 Ghost in the Shell: Stand Alone Complex - Tachikoma
 Pilotwings 64 - Kiwi
 Radiata Stories - Adina, Elena, Lulu, and Marsha
 Rumble Roses XX - EDIT Voice Type 2
 Star Ocean: First Departure - Lulu
 Star Ocean: Till the End of Time - Peppita Rossetti
 Xenosaga Episode I: Der Wille zur Macht - MOMO

Other
 Black Mask - Tracy Lee (English dub, uncredited)
 PBS Kids - Dot
 Gangstar: Lost Of Stock Car Race - Baby Hamm & Him 6Y

References

External links

 Official agency profile
 Sherry Lynn at the English Voice Actor & Production Staff Database
 

Living people
American voice actresses
American video game actresses
Actresses from Tacoma, Washington
Actresses from Los Angeles
20th-century American actresses
21st-century American actresses
Year of birth missing (living people)